Sweet Home is a South Korean webtoon written by Kim Carnby and illustrated by Hwang Young-chan. First published in Naver Webtoon, the webtoon ran for a total of 140 chapters plus 1 prologue from October 12, 2017, to July 2, 2020. It centers on a suicidal high school boy who, along with a group of fellow apartment residents, tries to survive a "monsterization" apocalypse (goemulhwa) where people turn into monsters that reflect their innermost, most desperate desires.

The webtoon is the second collaborative work by Kim and Hwang, the first being Bastard (2014–16). As of January 2021, its official English version garnered 2.4 million subscribers and 15.2 million likes. A print version of Sweet Home was released since February 28, 2020 by Wisdom House. It has also been adapted into a Netflix series of the same name released on December 18, 2020. A prequel titled Shotgun Boy, written by Kim and illustrated by Hongpil with Hwang providing editorial supervision, was released in Naver Webtoon starting February 22, 2021.

Plot

Prologue, Chapters 1-38 
After his family died in a vehicular accident, suicidal 18-year-old boy Cha Hyun-soo moves into Room 1410 of an apartment complex called Green Home. He and the people around him start being afflicted with strange symptoms, including malevolent talking voices and nosebleeds. One night, through his video door-phone, he witnesses his girl neighbor from Room 1411 transform into a human-eating monster.

Two days later, Hyun-soo realizes that the world around him has fallen into chaos as people turn into monsters in what the Internet calls a "monsterization" apocalypse (goemulhwa). Downstairs, his fellow residents, led by Lee Eun-hyuk, fend off the first monster from outside to attack the apartment but not before it claims its first victim. Multiple residents are killed in the struggle against the monsters. To survive potential monster attacks, Hyun-soo arms himself with a makeshift spear with a knife as a spearhead and, upon the advise of Room 1408's Han Du-shik, uses his phone as a monster tracker: if he makes a phone call and hears a beeping noise, it is a sign of a nearby monster. He sneaks himself to Room 1408 where Du-shik modifies his spear so that an electric charge passes through the knife and Hyun-soo can both stab and shock a monster.

Hyun-soo extracts two bereaved children, 9-year-old Kim Soo-young and 6-year-old Kim Young-soo, in Room 1210. His return to Room 1408 is impeded by his inner monster's attempt to fully monsterize him and another monster attack, which separates him from the kids. Room 1510's Yoon Ji-soo and Room 1506's Jung Jae-heon rescue him. Soo-young and Young-soo become trapped in the midst of a fight between two monsters, but another half-monsterized woman Im Myung-sook defends the children. Hyun-soo, Ji-soo and Jae-heon come to her aid.

After staying for a day at Room 1408, Hyun-soo, Ji-soo and Jae-heon decide to join the survivors in the ground floor; the trio entrusts Myung-sook, Soo-young and Young-soo to Du-shik. Hyun-soo gets knocked out in a battle against a monster. While unconscious, his inner monster gives him a taste of a parallel world where Hyun-soo's desire—watching his best-loved film Maria From the Sky—is fully met. Sensing that he is just inside a hallucination, Hyun-soo rejects his inner monster's temptations and finally wakes up. By his side are Eun-hyuk and his younger sister Lee Eun-yoo: he had survived the battle and reached the ground floor.

Chapters 39-85 
A meeting is convened in order to discuss whether or not the Green Home residents must expel Hyun-soo for being half-monsterization. Eun-hyuk suggests resolving the issue through voting, telling the group that indiscriminately expelling Hyun-soo would be tantamount to murdering him. The voting results in a tie; when an imperious elderly man Kim Seok-hyun expresses objection, his nose bleeds, unintentionally exposing his impending monsterization to his fellow residents. Later, Eun-hyuk asks Hyun-soo and a gangster-like man Pyeon Sang-wook to extract the survivors in Room 1408 so that they can take advantage of Du-shik's technical skills. While Hyun-soo and Sang-wook leave the ground floor for the mission, Myung-sook finally succumbs to her inner monster, but her strong desire to be reunited with her lost baby turns Myung-sook into a harmless, giant fetus monster inside the Room 1408 bathroom

Along the way to Room 1408, Hyun-soo and Sang-wook meet other survivors, an elderly man Ahn Gil-seop and his caretaker Park Yoo-ri, after battling against multiple monsters. Hyun-soo and Sang-wook return to the ground floor with Du-shik while Gil-seop, Yoo-ri and the children remain in Room 1408. Du-shik fixes one of the apartment's elevators but it inadvertently leads to the fully monsterized security guard to enter the ground floor and killing a few survivors, including Jae-heon. The shock of seeing Jae-heon's dead body makes Hyun-soo's inner monster to temporarily manifest. Upon regaining control, Hyun-soo kills the monsterized security guard. The remaining survivors in Room 1408 use the elevator and reunite with Hyun-soo and the survivors in the ground floor.

A team consisting of Hyun-soo, Sang-wook, Ji-soo, Gil-seop and Yoo-ri successfully reclaims the underground parking lot from the monsters. Du-shik revamps a car into an armored vehicle. Hyun-soo, Sang-wook, Gil-seop and another survivor Byung-il use this car to venture outside Green Home in an attempt to gather food and medical supplies. A monster attack jeopardizes the party's mission; Gil-seop is killed while Byung-il escapes from the scene. Eun-hyuk and the other survivors prepare to step out of Green Home to help Hyun-soo and Sang-wook. Just in time, a prison bus suddenly arrives and drives into the monster, killing it. Byung-il emerges from the bus accompanied by a group of outsiders, the first four recognized by Sang-wook to be criminals—group leader Shin Joong-seop, con-man Im Hyun-shik, rapist Seo Kap-soo, gangster Baek Ho-yeon, and a young man Jo Yi-hyun.

Chapters 86-111 
The Green Home survivors are forced to take in the outsiders; tensions rise as the outsiders implement their secret plan to take over the apartment. As Hyun-shik attempts at spreading fear and discord among the Green Home survivors, Joong-seop tries to invite Hyun-soo to join their group and reveals Yi-hyun to be a strong half-monster. The criminals soon assume superiority, leading to some Green Home survivors to join their side, including Hyun-soo. After not sharing any plans to the criminals, Eun-hyuk is locked up with Sang-wook. Eun-hyuk reveals to Sang-wook that he actually has a plan that only he and Du-shik knows; his nose starts to bleed and he faints. Du-shik is forced to reveal to Joong-seop a large box containing what appears to be a rope made of a chain of clothes; when Joong-seop dismisses it, Du-shik is relieved: the rope is actually over 100 meters long and has a grappling hook attached in the end.

On Joong-seop's orders, Hyun-soo and Yi-hyun search the upper levels of Green Home for other monsters. By letting his inner monster communicate with Hyun-soo's, Yi-hyun discovers the harmless giant fetus monster in the Room 1408 bathroom and, controlled by his inner monster, intends to kill it. Hyun-soo battles against Yi-hyun to defend the fetus monster and manages to knock Yi-hyun back to his normal self. Hyun-soo and Yi-hyun goes to Room 1408 to check on the monster and, to Hyun-soo's shock, discovers in its place a human-sized cocoon-like structure. Hyun-soo deduces that the thing is alive when he hears its heartbeat. Fearing it could be a threat, Yi-hyun tries to destroy the cocoon but his half-monsterization abilities strangely fights back and knocks him out.

Ji-soo goes to Room 1408 and finds Hyun-soo who is hesitant to destroy the monster-turned-cocoon. Though she also perceives it as a possible threat, Ji-soo is just as hesitant to destroy the cocoon, and reveals to Hyun-soo about Eun-hyuk and Sang-wook being locked up. Yi-hyun wakes up in his inner monster's personality and tosses a lighter to the cocoon, setting it on fire. All monsters in the vicinity sense the destruction of the cocoon and angrily swarm to the apartment. Yi-hyun rushes to the rooftop where he apparently sees a naked woman standing on the parapet. Sang-wook escapes from imprisonment, carrying Eun-hyuk with him. Eun-hyuk wakes up and suggests going to the outsiders' prison bus, where they find coolers containing chopped up human cadaver. Sang-wook tries to lure the monsters away from the apartment using the human cadaver as bait and ends up in a grove where four cocoons stand. While in hiding, he witnesses to his shock a naked human being emerge from one of the cocoons.

Chapters 112-139 
As the enraged monsters start to breach the front door barricade, Eun-hyuk confirms to Du-shik that they have to proceed with their plan: the survivors shall escape from the apartment by launching the grappling hook from the rooftop and using the rope to zipline to a hill 80 meters behind the apartment. The survivors flee to upper floors as Eun-yoo uses Ji-soo's smartphone as a distraction for the monsters. Sang-wook uses the prison bus to block the front door and flings Joong-seop to the monsters. The monsterizing Du-shik decides to stay behind in the underground parking lot and starts a fire that burns multiple monsters. As Eun-hyuk and the other survivors climb to the rooftop with the escape equipment, Hyun-soo goes to the parking lot, only to find Du-shik dying. A naked man, one of the emergent humans, appears to Hyun-soo, declares "[their] time has finally come," and puts his hands on Hyun-soo's shoulders, instantly triggering another hallucination with Hyun-soo's inner monster.

The inner monster reveals the nature of the monsterization phenomena, which he calls a "revolution" and a "new beginning." An inner monster—revealed to be a malevolent form of the host's soul—takes advantage of its host's. When the host succumbs to the inner monster's calling, the inner monster transforms the host into a monster reflecting that desire, while the host's subconscious is held in a parallel world where those desires are fully met ("a paradise of desires"). After the host exhausts his or her desires, they transform into a new human being (i.e. the emergent humans) void of desires and emotions and thriving on a "sense of futility." Hyun-soo firmly rejects the inner monster's temptation, deciding to stay as himself and continue the fight against the monsters.

Sang-wook and Hyun-sik joins Hyun-soo in the underground parking lot and kills the fully monsterized Du-shik. As Eun-hyuk's party reaches the rooftop, Ji-soo leaves the group and goes back to her room where she uses her bass guitar and amplifier to lure the monsters away from the rooftop, leaving a manageable number that the survivors can fight against. Hearing the bass guitar, Hyun-soo lets his inner monster control him and rescues Ji-soo in his near-monsterized form. After Eun-hyuk and Byung-il successfully install the escape equipment, Eun-hyuk decides to stay in the building due to his ongoing monsterization.

The women and children zipline to the hill first using all available pulleys. Eun-hyuk, Sang-wook and Yi-hyun join Hyun-soo and Ji-soo's battle against the monsters in the building. They all go to the roof afterwards but their escape from the building is thwarted by the overwhelmingly powerful, fully monsterized Joong-seop. Left with no other choice, Hyun-soo makes the ultimate sacrifice by fully succumbing to his monsterization, which turns him into a powerful monster in the form of his favorite character from Maria From the Sky. The monsterized Hyun-soo defeats the monsterized Joong-seop with one blow. Ji-soo tries to communicate with it, but the true Hyun-soo inside the "paradise of desires" responds only faintly to her voice and the physical monster reacts to her with utmost hostility. Eun-hyuk decides also to let himself be fully monsterized in order to subdue the monsterized Hyun-soo. As the remaining survivors zipline to their haven, Eun-hyuk's monsterization turns him into a large tangled mass that completely covers the monsterized Hyun-soo, killing them both.

Soon after, rain falls over the dead remains of the monsterized Hyun-soo and Eun-hyuk. Most of the tangled mass disintegrates and two cocoons materialize; one of them hatches and a new Hyun-soo emerges from the cocoon. He descends the building and, upon reaching the ground floor, he notices Ji-soo's smartphone which Eun-yoo had used earlier to distract the monsters. It is already unlocked and displays a music player app. Hyun-soo picks it up and plays an audio file: it is the musical piece that Ji-soo composed and was supposed to have lyrics written by the old Hyun-soo. Strangely, the new Hyun-soo listens to the music and sheds tears.

Chapter 140 (Epilogue) 
Winter, in the post-apocalyptic world—the Green Home survivors live in a military camp. Byung-il, who guards the perimeter, suddenly sees something. Ji-soo is fetched from one of the tents. She rushes to the perimeter and sees the new Hyun-soo clad in thin clothing and walking towards the camp, barefooted on the snow. Upon seeing Ji-soo, the new Hyun-soo smiles teary-eyed. Ji-soo steps out of the camp in tears and hugs Hyun-soo tightly as the other Green House survivors rush out to meet him.

Characters

Main 

 Cha Hyun-soo
 An 18-year-old human turned half-monster, the sole occupant of Room 1410 in Green Home and the protagonist of the webtoon. Hyun-soo is a spoiled and  suicidal high-school boy who recently lost his family. After his family's death in a car accident, he moves into Green Home apartment when he arrogantly and unkindly tells off his worried(some angry)relatives at his parents'/sister's funeral that he only got a small inheritance(as he intended to live off that money before he becomes a professional gamer), all which beat him than throw him out of the family ring. After a few strange encounters and brushes with death, Hyun Soo finds himself caught in the middle of a "monsterization" apocalypse. In fighting against the monsters, he uses a makeshift spear with an electrified knife for its spearhead. His strong resistance against his inner monster leads to the inner monster failing to "monsterize" him completely, turning him into a "half-monster." His half-monsterization endows him with abilities (self-heal, electricity resistance, superhuman strength, agility, and durability) which he uses in battling against monsters. He later harbors feelings for Ji-soo.
 Yoon Ji-soo
 A 20-year-old bass guitarist, composer and sole occupant of Room 1510 in Green Home; Hyun-soo's love interest. Ji-soo moved into Green Home after her boyfriend's suicide. Since her room is directly above Hyun-soo's, she disturbs Hyun-soo when she plays the bass loudly. She frequently accompanies Hyun-soo in fighting against monsters, brandishing a baseball bat as weapon. She later harbors feelings for Hyun-soo.
 Pyeon Sang-wook
 A 32-year-old ex-policeman and occupant of Green Home. Sang-wook is often mistaken as a gangster, owing to his tall, muscular and intimidating appearance. He uses his brute strength in fighting against the monsters alongside Hyun-soo. He's also in charge of guarding the food and monitoring the rations. Its revealed in latter chapters that he's a former police officer who was dismissed from his job due to excessive use of force. He later harbors feelings for Yoo-ri.
 Lee Eun-hyuk
 An 18-year-old occupant of Green Home; Eun-yoo's elder brother and leader of the Green Home survivors. Despite his age, Eun-hyuk became the leader among the apartment's survivors because of his cleverness, calmness, and competence to lead. He takes on the alias "CrewCrew" when doing online games. In the prequel Shotgun Boy, he is revealed to be a friend of the main character Han Kyu-hwan.

Supporting

Green Home 
 Han Du-shik 
 The sole occupant of Room 1408 in Green Home. Du-shik lost his left leg after rescuing a child and is bound to a wheelchair. A former engineer and a skilled craftsman, he makes his own weapons in fending the monsters off, upgrades to the survivors' weapons (notably Hyun-soo's spear), and collaborates with Eun-hyuk in planning the survivors' ultimate building escape plan.
 Jung Jae-heon
 a Korean language teacher and occupant of Room 1506 in Green Home. A devout Christian, Jae-heon wields a long sword and usually whispers a prayer while battling against the monsters.
 Lee Eun-yoo
 an occupant of Green Home; Eun-hyuk's younger sister. Eun-yoo carries with her a lighter and an aerosol spray which she uses in setting monsters on fire.
 Park Yoo-ri
 a 28-year-old occupant of Green Home; Gil-seop's caretaker. Yoo-ri uses a crossbow in battling against the monsters. She becomes romantically involved with Sang-wook in the later part of the webtoon.
 Ahn Gil-seop
 a 50-year-old occupant of Green Home. Gil-seop is being taken care of by Yoo-ri. He uses Molotov cocktails in fighting against the monsters.
 Kim Soo-young
 the 9-year-old daughter of the man from Room 1210 in Green Home; Young-soo's elder sister.
 Kim Young-soo
 the 6-year-old son of the man from Room 1210 in Green Home; Soo-young's younger brother.
 Im Myung-sook
 a half-monster occupant of Green Home. Myung-sook believes her infant is still alive despite her infant being dead already due to an accident. Her desperate desire to see her infant once again made her resist her inner monster's malevolent power and she turns into a harmless giant fetus monster.
 Byung-il
 an occupant of Green Home. Byung-il brings a group of outsiders to Green Home, unknowing of their identities and their ulterior motives.
 Ahn Seon-young
 an occupant of Green Home; Seok-hyun's battered wife.
 Kim Seok-hyun
 an occupant of Green Home; Seon-young's abusive husband. Seok-hyun is a typical old-school person who thinks adults are superior over younger people.
 Son Hye-in
 an occupant of Green Home. Hye-in is a fearful girl who tends to make rash decisions for her survival; one of the survivors who sided with the outsiders.
 The security guard
 the unnamed security guard of Green Home. He turned into a monster that reflects his hatred towards the Green Home occupants, most of whom have treated him harshly and disrespectfully. As a monster, he gains more weight and strength after every kill.
 The girl from Room 1411
 the unnamed sole occupant of Room 1411 in Green Home; Hyun-soo's next-door neighbor. She is a celebrity wannabe who goes to multiple auditions and frequently starves herself. Her monsterization into a starving, flesh-eating monster was the first one that Hyun-soo witnessed during the apocalypse.
 Ryu Jae-hwan
 an occupant of Green Home. Jae-hwan is an aspiring celebrity who later turns into a tall attention-seeking monster which causes a very painful headache to a victim who does not give it a positive feedback (e.g. "You're handsome.").
 Sang-soo
 an occupant of Green Home; one of the survivors who sided with the outsiders.
 Ji-eun
 an occupant of Green Home; one of the survivors who sided with the outsiders.

Outsiders 

 Shin Joong-seop
 an outsider who is the leader of the group of criminals. Joong-seop is hell-bent into killing monsters after his entire family died because of them. He is acquainted with Sang-wook.
 Im Hyun-shik
 an outsider and criminal who is part of Joong-seop's group; a con-man.
 Jo Yi-hyun
 an outsider and half-monster who is part of Joong-seop's group. Yi-hyun has multiple personalities, which leads to his inner monster controlling only one personality and not being able to monsterize him fully. He has the ability of arm extension, in which he can lengthen or swell his arm or transform it into a deadly branching form that he can use to stab multiple monsters at once.
 Seo Kap-soo
 an outsider and criminal who is part of Joong-seop's group; a rapist.
 Baek Ho-yeon
 an outsider and criminal who is part of Joong-seop's group; a gangster.

Notable monsters 
Note: The monsters contained in this list are those which are already in monster form in their first appearance in the webtoon (the former human forms of some are revealed only through flashbacks or hints given in the story).

 Blood-sucking monster
 the first monster to attack Green Home from outside. It is a hematophagous, humanoid monster with a gaping mouth that extends to its chest and has a long proboscis-like tongue which it uses to suck the fluids of its victim.
 Half-headed monster
 a blind humanoid monster which became half-headed after Jae-heon sliced its head transversely. It is very sensitive to sound and is capable of arm branching similar to Yi-hyun's which makes it capable of puncturing objects and stabbing humans and fellow monsters at great speed. The monster was once a disgruntled office worker who lost his job.
 Eyeball monster
 it has the body of a man with a long, extendible neck and a giant round mass with multiple eyes for its head.
 Muscular monster
 appears to be a tall, muscular humanoid monster. It usually mutters the words "protein," "strength" and "muscle"; it is angered when it is teased of being weak.
 Liquid monster
 a relatively harmless, non-hostile monster that appears as a mass of transparent slime shaped like a human being with two floating eyeballs in its "head." It is revealed that the monster was once a young boy named Min-cheol who was hiding in a closet when his mother was killed by the half-headed monster. Min-cheol's desire not be seen is reflected by the sentence the monster mutters, "Can you see me?"
 Tentacle monster  / Spider monster
 a monster that appears to be a human corpse in supine position with multiple tentacles shooting out from its back and acting like legs. When Hyun-soo and Sang-wook set it in fire, it douses itself with water through a fire sprinkler and evolves into a spider monster capable of spitting a corrosive fluid.
 Long-armed monster
 a humanoid, gibbon-like monster capable of arm extension. It is revealed that the monster was once a man who lived in immense guilt after failing to rescue his son from the monsters, which is reflected in the phrase it mutters, "hold my hand."
 Track-and-field monster
 a fast-moving humanoid three-eyed monster which mutters "too slow." It is revealed that the monster was once a track-and-field athlete who murdered his roommate and rival before his monsterization.
 Flying monster
 a bat-like monster; the only monster known to be capable of flight.

Other characters involved in the monsterization apocalypse 
 The inner monsters
 the malevolent personas that awaken in people and transform them into monsters; the prime movers of the monsterization apocalypse. It is revealed in latter chapters that the inner monsters are the fiendish forms of the souls of humans beings born through the repression of human desires; seeking for the satiating of those desires, they incite a "revolution" through the monsterization apocalypse. An inner monster takes advantage of its host's innermost, most desperate desires and transforms the host into a monster that reflect those desires, while the host's subconscious is imprisoned in a "paradise of desires," a parallel world where those desires are fully met (letting the host turn into an emotionless, desireless human being later on when the desires are finally exhausted).
 The emergent humans (Übermensch)
 a new race of humans that emerge from cocoons that form from the remains of dead monsters. When a monster dies or after a monster's true persona exhausts his or her desires while being in the "paradise of desires," the monster transforms into a new human being void of desires and emotions and thriving on a "sense of futility." In the prequel Shotgun Boy, it is revealed that these beings are also referred to as the Übermensch.

Major themes

Style

Art 
The artistic style of Sweet Home is characterized by maintaining a "claustrophobic and grotesque atmosphere." There is additional emphasis on the characters' appearance: the human characters' facial expressions, and the monsters' physical forms which take on a "familiar yet horrific twist". The webtoon also exhibits multiple changes in font style which help set the atmosphere of various scenes, through "color changes, opacity changes, capitalization, size changes, and font changes."

Just like many modern, third-generation webtoons, Sweet Home uses built-in background music, particularly in its 140th chapter (epilogue) which contains a track titled "MZ - Sweet Home (incomplete ver.)."

Narrative and characterization 
Among thriller-horror stories that deal with gruesome characters such as zombies and monsters, Sweet Home is notable for treating a relatively similar set of characters in a different light. This is evident by its introduction of the idea of human beings turning into monsters not through external factors (e.g. virus, curse) but through the expression of their desires.

The webtoon is also said to go beyond simple horror storytelling and focuses on character development, especially on its protagonist Cha Hyun-soo. In the webtoon, Hyun-soo is portrayed as a reclusive boy who, at first, lives only for himself and is ready to die. But as soon as the monsterization apocalypse begins, he makes a big change by wanting to step out of his room, connecting with other people and staying alive.

Background and publication history

Naver webtoon 
Sweet Home marks the second collaborative work between webtoon writer Kim Carnby and webtoon artist Hwang Young-chan. The first work by Kim and Hwang is Bastard (2014–16), a thriller story about son who lives with his father, a serial killer.

First published in Naver Webtoon, Sweet Home ran on a weekly basis on Thursdays. Its prologue was uploaded on October 12, 2017, followed by the first chapter on October 19; the webtoon ended with the uploading of its epilogue and 140th chapter on July 2, 2020. The official English version of the webtoon (Prologue up to Chapter 139) was uploaded on Mondays in WEBTOON starting January 15, 2018, while Chapter 140 (Epilogue) was uploaded on September 29, 2020. It is also available in Chinese, Japanese, French, Indonesian, Spanish and Thai.

After the success of Sweet Home, Kim collaborated with webtoon illustrator Hongpil for its prequel titled Shotgun Boy which was released in Naver Webtoon starting February 22, 2021 with Hwang providing editorial supervision. The webtoon tells the story of the titular "shotgun [high school] boy" Han Kyu-hwan and the events prior to Sweet Home.

Print version 
A print version of Sweet Home from the prologue up to Chapter 105 was released on February 28, 2020 (volumes 1–3), October 15, 2020 (volumes 4–6) and April 29, 2021 (volumes 7–9) by Wisdom House.

Volume list

Reception 

As of January 2021, the official English version of Sweet Home garnered 2.4 million subscribers and 15.2 million likes. The print version of the webtoon was also recognized by the Korea Manhwa Contents Agency (KOMACON) as one of the "50 Best Comic Books of 2020." ATK Magazine's Kate Maugans called the webtoon a "wild ride" and marked its "compelling story and intriguing art."

Adaptations 

Sweet Home has been adapted by Studio Dragon and Studio N into a Netflix series of the same name starring Song Kang, Lee Jin-wook and Lee Si-young who play Hyun-soo, Sang-wook and a new character Seo Yi-kyeong, respectively. Netflix officially announced the series' cast on December 18, 2019. Helmed by director Lee Eung-bok, the series was released on December 18, 2020, to mixed reviews.

Notes

References

External links 
 스위트홈 (original Korean version)
 Sweet Home (official English translation)

South Korean webtoons
Naver Comics titles
2010s webtoons
Horror webtoons